Fulvia Stevenin (born 18 October 1965) is an Italian former alpine skier who competed in the 1984 Winter Olympics.

References

External links
 

1965 births
Living people
Italian female alpine skiers
Olympic alpine skiers of Italy
Alpine skiers at the 1984 Winter Olympics